Pyrgulopsis bedfordensis, is a species of minute freshwater snails with an operculum, aquatic gastropod molluscs or micromolluscs in the family Hydrobiidae.  It is listed as critically imperiled on the Montana Species of Concern list.

This species is endemic to a  stretch of Bedford Spring Creek near Townsend, Montana, United States.  Its natural habitat is streams.

References

Molluscs of the United States
bedfordensis
Gastropods described in 2001